The government of the Federated States of Micronesia (FSM) conducts its own foreign relations. Since independence in 1986, the FSM has established diplomatic relations with a number of nations, including most of its Pacific neighbors.

Regional relations 

Regional cooperation through various multilateral organizations is a key element in FSM's foreign policy. FSM is a full member of the Pacific Islands Forum, the South Pacific Applied Geoscience Commission,  the Pacific Regional Environment Programme and the Secretariat of the Pacific Community. The country also is one of the eight signatories of the Nauru Agreement Concerning Cooperation In The Management Of Fisheries Of Common Interest which collectively controls 25-30% of the world's tuna supply and approximately 60% of the western and central Pacific tuna supply.

Diplomatic relations

Bilateral relations 
The FSM maintains permanent embassies in four nations: China, Fiji, Japan and the United States. The FSM also maintains a resident consulate in Hawaii, Portland, Oregon and Guam. The FSM maintains non-resident embassies for four nations: Indonesia, Malaysia and Singapore (all in Japan) and Israel in Fiji. Four nations maintain permanent embassies in the FSM: Australia, China, Japan and the United States. Additionally, 15 nations maintain non-resident embassies with the FSM. France and the United Kingdom have non-resident embassies for the FSM in Fiji. Canada, Italy and South Africa have non-resident embassies for the FSM in Australia. Indonesia has a non-resident embassy for the FSM in Japan. Chile has its non-resident embassies for the FSM in the United States. Croatia has its non-resident embassy for the FSM in Indonesia. Czech Republic, Finland, the Netherlands, Portugal, Spain, and Switzerland have non-resident embassies in the Philippines. New Zealand has its non-resident embassy for the FSM in Kiribati.

Membership in international organizations 

The Federated States of Micronesia was admitted to the United Nations on 17 September 1991. Additionally outside the region, FSM is a member or participant of the ACP (Lomé Convention),  the Alliance of Small Island States, the Asian Development Bank, the Economic and Social Commission for Asia and the Pacific (ESCAP), the Food and Agriculture Organization (FAO), the G-77, the International Bank for Reconstruction and Development, the International Civil Aviation Organization, the International Red Cross and Red Crescent Movement, the International Development Association, the International Finance Corporation, the IMF, the International Olympic Committee, the ITU, the NAM and the World Meteorological Organization.

The FSM is notably one of four UN-recognized nations with a sea border that is not a member of the International Maritime Organization (the others are Nauru, Niue and Palau).  Similarly, the FSM is one of only six UN members that is not a member of the Universal Postal Union.
Finally, as with many other nations in Oceania, the FSM is not a member of Interpol or of the International Hydrographic Organization.

See also 
 Compact of Free Association
 List of diplomatic missions in the Federated States of Micronesia
 List of diplomatic missions of the Federated States of Micronesia
 Trust Territory of the Pacific Islands

References 

 
Government of the Federated States of Micronesia